Robert Stringam Stevens (June 10, 1916 – September 9, 2000) was a politician who rose to the level of California State Senator before being appointed judge of the Los Angeles County Superior Court by governor Jerry Brown in 1977.  He left the bench in 1981.

References

External links

Join California Robert S. Stevens

1916 births
2000 deaths
Republican Party California state senators
Republican Party members of the California State Assembly
California state court judges
20th-century American judges
20th-century American politicians